"Heaven" is a song by the English rock band The Psychedelic Furs, written by the band's lead singer Richard Butler and bass player Tim Butler. It was the first single from the band's fourth studio album, Mirror Moves (1984). As a single it reached the top 30 of the charts in the United Kingdom and peaked at number 41 in New Zealand.

Release and reception
Released in 1984, "Heaven" entered the UK Singles Chart in April 1984, peaked at number 29, and spent five weeks in the chart.
The song reached number 41 in New Zealand. British filmmaker Tim Pope directed the song's official music video.

AllMusic critic Bill Janovitz called it a "gorgeous pop song", and praised Richard Butler for being "remarkably expressive in his phrasing and in his extraordinary voice". 
Janovitz credited producer Keith Forsey for striking a balance of pop music and punk rock influences on the track.

"Heaven" was covered by Buffalo Tom on their 1990 album Birdbrain, 
Annie Lennox on the Japanese edition of her 1995 album Medusa,
Face to Face on their 2001 album Standards & Practices, 
Alkaline Trio on the 2004 compilation album Another Year on the Streets, Vol. 3, 
and Nouvelle Vague on their album 3, released in 2009.

Track listing
7" Single
"Heaven" - 3:27
"Heartbeat" (remix) - 5:10

12" Single
"Heaven" (full version) - 4:25
"Heartbeat" (New York remix) - 8:09

Chart performance

References

1984 singles
The Psychedelic Furs songs
1984 songs
Columbia Records singles
Songs written by Tim Butler
Songs written by Richard Butler (singer)